Torvald Appelroth (28 July 1902 – 12 March 1984) was a Finnish fencer. He competed in the individual foil and épée events at the 1928 Summer Olympics.

References

External links
 

1902 births
1984 deaths
People from Porvoo
People from Uusimaa Province (Grand Duchy of Finland)
Finnish male épée fencers
Olympic fencers of Finland
Fencers at the 1928 Summer Olympics
Finnish male foil fencers
Sportspeople from Uusimaa